μ Orionis (Latinised to Mu Orionis, abbreviated to μ Ori or Mu Ori) is a quadruple star system in the constellation Orion, similar to Mizar and Epsilon Lyrae with combined visual magnitude of 4.13. The four stars are known as Mu Orionis Aa, Mu Orionis Ab, Mu Orionis Ba, and Mu Orionis Bb. The A and B systems are several tenths of an arcsecond apart. The entire system is located approximately 150 light years from the Sun.

Mu Orionis Aa is an A5V dwarf and metallic line star, of effective temperature , and apparent magnitude of +4.31.

Mu Orionis Ba and Bb are F5V dwarfs with 1.4 solar masses and apparent magnitudes of 6.91.

μ Orionis falls just outside an unrelated planetary nebula Abell 12.  The bright star makes detecting the faint nebula difficult and it has been nicknamed The Hidden.

References

External links
 http://stars.astro.illinois.edu/sow/muori.html

Orion (constellation)
Orionis, Mu
4
A-type main-sequence stars
F-type main-sequence stars
G-type main-sequence stars
Spectroscopic binaries
Orionis, 61
2124
040932
028614
Durchmusterung objects
J05351889-0516140
Am stars